The 2000–01 Hellenic Football League season was the 48th in the history of the Hellenic Football League, a football competition in England.

At the end of the previous season the Hellenic League merged with the Chiltonian League. 17 clubs from the latter formed Division One East, while Hellenic League Division One clubs formed Division One West.

Premier Division

The Premier Division featured 17 clubs which competed in the division last season, along with three new clubs:
Cheltenham Saracens, promoted from Division One
Wootton Bassett Town, promoted from Division One
Yate Town, relegated from the Southern Football League

League table

Division One East

Division One East was formed by 17 clubs from the Chiltonian League, adsorbed by the Hellenic League at the end of the previous season.

League table

Division One West

Division One West featured 13 clubs which competed in Division One last season, along with three new clubs:
Gloucester United
Malmesbury Victoria, joined from the Wiltshire League
Witney Academy

League table

References

External links
 Hellenic Football League

2000-01
8